Dry run may refer to:

 Dry run (testing), a testing process
 Dry run (terrorism), a test by a terrorist organization to examine the reaction to an attempted attack

Places in the United States

Settlements
 Dry Run, Ohio, a census-designated place in Hamilton County
 Dry Run, Scioto County, Ohio, an unincorporated community
 Dry Run, Pennsylvania, an unincorporated community
 Dry Run, West Virginia, an unincorporated community

Streams
 Dry Run (Lehigh River tributary) in Pennsylvania
 Dry Run (Susquehecka Creek tributary) in Pennsylvania
 Dry Run (West Branch Susquehanna River tributary) in Pennsylvania
 Dry Fork (Cheat River tributary), or Dry Run, in West Virginia

Arts and entertainment
 Dark Waters (2019 film) (working title: Dry Run), an American film
 Dry Run, a 2010 film featuring Diora Baird
 "Dry Run" (Alfred Hitchcock Presents), a television episode
 "The Dry Run" (Mad About You), a television episode
 "Dry Run", a short story by Larry Niven collected in Convergent Series
 "Dry Run", a song by Acid King from Zoroaster
 "Dry Run", a song by Dark Tranquillity from Character
 "Dry Run", a song by Ghoti Hook from Sumo Surprise

See also 
 Arroyo (creek), an intermittently dry creek
 Dry Creek (disambiguation)
 Dry Fork (disambiguation)
 Dry River (disambiguation)